Polish Young Greens (Polish: Stowarzyszenie Ostra Zieleń) is the youth organisation of The Polish Green Party.

Aim 
Polish Young Greens state that "The aim of Polish Young Greens is to promote values such as human rights, sustainable development, democracy, ecology, tolerance, and European integration. We want to learn how to resolve conflicts without using violence, counteract discrimination, racism, sexism, homophobia, socialize young people and local communities. To this end, we organize seminars, international exchanges, meetings, discussions and concerts. We also react to current political and social events: we organize happenings, we take part in protests and demonstrations."

Membership 
Anyone between the age of 13 and 35 can join Polish Young Greens. There is an obligatory participation fee 5 PLN monthly, but there are some exceptions from this rule.

Affiliations 
Polish Young Greens are affiliated with The Polish Green Party, being its youth organisation. Polish Young Greens are also a member of the Federation of Young European Greens (FYEG) and Cooperation and Development Network in Eastern Europe (CDNEE).

References 

ostra-zielen.pl

Youth wings of green parties in Europe
Youth wings of political parties in Poland
Organizations established in 2005
2005 establishments in Poland
Organisations based in Warsaw